Tipula californica, also known by its common name California Tipula is a species from the subgenus Hesperotipula.

References

    

Tipulidae
Insects described in 1908